Agron may refer to:

People
 Agron (given name)
 Agron (surname)

Fictional and legendary characters
 Agron (mythology), a figure in Greek mythology
 Agron of Lydia, fourth king of Maeonia
 Agron, a character on American television show Spartacus

Other uses
 Agron (dictionary), Saadia Gaon's reference work
 Agrón, a town in southern Spain
 Agron House, a landmark in Jerusalem

See also
 Agron J, shorthand for the Agronomy Journal